Operation Sunbeam (also known as Operation Dominic II) was a series of four nuclear tests conducted at the United States's Nevada Test Site in 1962. Operation Sunbeam tested tactical nuclear warheads; the most notable was the Davy Crockett.

The chief milestone of Operation Sunbeam was that it was the last nuclear test series on the Nevada Test Site conducted in the atmosphere by the United States. Since Operation Sunbeam, specifically the Little Feller 1 test of the Davy Crockett, all US nuclear tests on the Test Site have been carried out underground in accordance with the Partial Test Ban Treaty.

List of the nuclear tests

References

Explosions in 1962
Sunbeam
1962 in military history
1962 in Nevada
1962 in the environment